Joachim Puchner (born September 25, 1987) is a retired World Cup alpine ski racer from Austria. Born in Vöcklabruck, Upper Austria, Puchner made his World Cup debut in January 2009 and specialized in the speed events of Downhill and Super G. He is the brother of alpine skier Mirjam Puchner.

World Cup podiums

3 podiums – (1 DH, 2 SG)

References

External links
 
 Joachim Puchner World Cup standings at the International Ski Federation
 
 
 Joachim-Puchner.at personal site  
 Joachim Puchner at Austrian Ski team (ÖSV) 
 Joachim Puchner at Atomic Skis

Austrian male alpine skiers
1987 births
Living people
Alpine skiers at the 2014 Winter Olympics
People from Vöcklabruck
Sportspeople from Upper Austria
21st-century Austrian people